Karl Ludwig Costenoble, also Carl Ludwig Costenoble, (25 December 1769 – 28 August 1837) was a German stage actor, theatre director and writer.

Life 
Born in Herford, Costenoble was the son of a Reformed cathedral preacher. He eluded his planned appointment as clergyman by fleeing to Magdeburg. He joined several travelling stages as an actor before he got firm engagements in Bayreuth, Salzburg and finally Hamburg, where he made his debut on 10 March 1801  and played until 1818 as audience favourite, occupying different fields from singer to character actor and comedian. Among his most famous roles were Shylock in Shakespeare's The Merchant of Venice and the monk in Lessings' Nathan the Wise.

In 1818 Costenoble was appointed to the Burgtheater in Vienna, whose ensemble he belonged to until his death. The celebrated actor was also active as a director here. Costenoble died on one of his numerous tours on his way home to Prague from a guest performance in Hamburg.

He was first married with the actress Johanna Steinhäuser. The sculptor Karl Costenoble was a son from his second marriage. The Viennese folk actress Mizzi Zwerenz was his great-granddaughter.

Costenoble was buried in Vienna by a memorial at the Vienna Central Cemetery (Group 14A, Number 50), which the sculptor Parschalk executed in the form of an obelisk and which was unveiled in 1910.

Work 
Costenoble was also active as a writer. Above all, he wrote numerous comedies and plays which enjoyed great popularity. He also wrote Almanac dramatischer Spiele (1810-16) and diaries, which were published in 1889 under the title Aus dem Burgtheater (1818-37).

Bibliography 
 BLKÖ:Costenoble, Karl Ludwig
 
 Großes biographisches Lexikon der Deutschen Bühne im XIX. Jahrhundert. Ludwig Eisenberg: Edition by Paul List, Leipzig 1903, 
 Alexander von Weilen: Carl Ludwig Costenobles Tagebücher von seiner Jugend bis zur Übersiedlung nach Wien. Gesellschaft für Theatergeschichte, Berlin 1912
 Costenoble über Grillparzer. Ungedruckte Notizen aus seinen Tagebüchern. Selbstverlag Alexander von Weilen, Vienna 1915
 Eleonora Schneck: Karl Ludwig Costenobles Leben und Wirken am Wiener Hofburgtheater 1818−1837. Mit neuen Mitteilungen aus seinen Tagebüchern. Dissertation. Vienna 1934
 
 
 Felix Czeike: Historisches Lexikon Wien Bd. 1. Kremayr & Scheriau, Vienna 1992

References

External links 
 
 Ludwig Costenoble on Wien Geschichte Wiki
 
 Costenoble on LexiconWestäliger Autorinnen und autoren

1769 births
1837 deaths
People from Herford
19th-century German male actors
German male stage actors
19th-century German dramatists and playwrights
19th-century German male writers
19th-century German writers
Burials at the Vienna Central Cemetery